Les Powell may refer to:

 Les Powell (footballer, born 1912), Australian rules footballer with Essendon and South Melbourne
 Les Powell (footballer, born 1921), Australian rules footballer with Fitzroy and Geelong

See also
 Leslie Powell, World War I flying ace